Silviu Ploeșteanu (28 January 1913 – 13 April 1969) was a Romanian footballer and manager.

Club career
Silviu Ploeșteanu, nicknamed Ploaie (Rain) was born on 28 January 1913 in Craiova, Romania and he started to play football in 1930 at UD Reșița, winning the Divizia A title in his first season as a footballer. In the following season he was a runner-up in Divizia A with UD Reșița, afterwards moving at Universitatea Cluj where he earned another runner-up position with the team in his first season spent at the club. In the following season, he reached with "U" Cluj in the 1934 Cupa României Final where he scored a goal in the first game as the club lost the trophy in front of Ripensia Timișoara. In 1937, Ploeșteanu switched teams again moving at Venus București with whom he won two Divizia A titles in the 1938–39 and 1939–40 seasons, being used by coach Béla Jánosy in 22 matches in which he scored three goals in the first one and in 21 games in which he scored four goals in the second. He also reached the 1940 Cupa României Final with Venus, which was composed of four games, Ploeșteanu playing in all of them, scoring a goal in the first as the team eventually lost in the last game against Rapid București. Silviu Ploeșteanu ended his career by spending one year as a player-coach in the regional championship at UA Brașov.

International career
Silviu Ploeșteanu played 11 games and scored one goal at international level for Romania, making his debut on 8 July 1937 under coach Constantin Rădulescu in a friendly which ended with a 2–0 away victory against Lithuania. He scored a goal in a game against Germany and was captain in a 2–1 victory against Yugoslavia. His last appearance took place on 12 October 1941 in a 3–2 victory against Slovakia.

International goals
Scores and results list Romania's goal tally first. "Score" column indicates the score after the player's goal.

Managerial career

Silviu Ploeșteanu started his managerial career at Steagul Roșu Brașov in 1948, being also a player in the first year. He helped Steagul earn the promotion from the regional championship to Divizia B in 1950, afterwards in 1956 promoting to Divizia A where he earned a runner-up position in the 1959–60 season, also managing to do some performances in the European competitions such as winning the 1960–61 Balkans Cup and reaching the 1965–66 Inter-Cities Fairs Cup sixteenths-finals as the club was eliminated by Espanyol Barcelona against whom he earned a 4–2 victory. In 1962 he also started coaching Romania's national team simultaneously while still coaching Steagul, leading the national team in four friendly games which consist of one victory, two draws and one loss, afterwards coaching Romania's Olympic team which he helped qualify to the 1964 Summer Olympics where the team finished on the 5th place. In January 1967, Ploeșteanu took the decision to change the colors of Steagul from white and blue to black and yellow, considering that in the new colors the team will be seen better on the field, being inspired to take this decision by his player, Csaba Györffy who participated with Romania's Olympic team in a tournament in Uruguay where after a match with Peñarol, Györffy received from captain Alberto Spencer the shirt with which he played and at the return in the country, he wore the shirt during his training sessions with the team. After 20 years spent at Steagul he was dismissed after the team finished on the last place of the 1967–68 season, relegating to Divizia B. His last coaching experience took part at Tractorul Brașov from 1968 until 1969. Silviu Ploeșteanu has a total of 249 Divizia A games as a manager, consisting of 104 victories, 49 draws and 96 losses.

Personal life
Silviu Ploeșteanu was known as an anti-communist, telling everyone whom he would interact:"Never call me comrade! I was born a sir and I will always be a sir". After dying of a heart attack on 13 April 1969, people who were close to him claim that one of the reasons of his death was because of the sadness he felt after being dismissed by Steagul Roșu Brașov after coaching it for 20 years. The Stadionul Silviu Ploeșteanu from Brașov is named in his honor.

Honours

Player
UD Reșița
Divizia A: 1930–31, runner-up 1931–32
Universitatea Cluj
Divizia A runner-up: 1932–33
Cupa României runner-up: 1933–34
Venus București
Divizia A: 1938–39, 1939–40
Cupa României runner-up: 1939–40

Manager
Steagul Roșu Brașov
Divizia A runner-up: 1959–60
Divizia B: 1956
Balkans Cup: 1960–61

References

External links

1913 births
1969 deaths
FC Brașov (1936) managers
CSM Reșița players
Venus București players
FC Brașov (1936) players
FC Universitatea Cluj players
Romanian football managers
Romanian footballers
Romania international footballers
Liga I players
Romania national football team managers
Association football forwards
Sportspeople from Craiova